Kandis Kola (also Romanized as Kandīs Kolā; also known as Gondes Kolā and Kondes Kolā) is a village in Panjak-e Rastaq Rural District, Kojur District, Nowshahr County, Mazandaran Province, Iran. At the 2006 census, its population was 64, in 20 families.

References 

Populated places in Nowshahr County